Benjamin Burt may refer to:

Benjamin Burt (silversmith) (1729–1805), American silversmith
Benjamin Burt (surgeon), Australian ophthalmologist and surgeon

See also
Ben Burtt (born 1948), American sound designer and filmmaker
Benjamin A. Burtt, American sound editor